Long Drop Cave is a cave on Leck Fell, in Lancashire, England. It leads into Death's Head Hole, and is part of the Three Counties System, an  cave system which spans the borders of Cumbria, Lancashire, and North Yorkshire.

Description
The entrance is below a small cliff in a shakehole. From the wide overhanging entrance, a short crawl leads onto an  dry shaft. At the bottom, an excavated route leads into a narrow stream passage, with a narrow  pitch a few metres downstream. A  pitch passes a ledge, and lands in Fault Chamber, where a vertical geological fault can be seen to have a  throw. A further  pitch leads to a final chamber and a stream passage. Upstream, the water emerges from an impenetrable fissure, downstream passes through a low crawl before the going eases, passing under some avens. After  the passage becomes a waterlogged tube which is normally sumped. This can be baled from the downstream end, to allow a through trip to Dolphin Passage in Death's Head Hole.

In Fault Chamber, an easy climb up the eastern rift reaches a small window, that can be forced to an  pitch that drops into an independent streamway - High Stream Passage. Downstream leads into High Stream Chamber where the water sinks in boulders to emerge from the impenetrable fissure mentioned above. A  pitch drops into High Stream Chamber from Humble Inlet. Two passages can be reached from the top. Upstream,  of decorated passage ends in a mineralised choke on a fault in the area of Humble Pot. The downstream passage is smaller and wetter, and finishes in a blind  pit.

A tight rift leads to the top of an  shaft. At the bottom, a tight crawl connects with the bottom of the first pitch in the main cave.

Geology and hydrology
The cave is a solutional cave formed in Visean Great Scar limestone from the Mississippian Series of the Carboniferous period. Its development has been largely determined by a vertical fault and a number of major joints. The streams that flow through the cave originate from small surface sinks. They flow through the lower passage into Dolphin Passage in Death's Head Hole, and hence into Lost John's Master Cave. It eventually emerges from the Leck Beck Head spring in Ease Gill.

History
Long Drop Cave was known by the Yorkshire Ramblers' Club by 1922, when S. W. Cutriss described it as: "Long Drop Sink with the cave at the far end, a 10 foot passage leading to Long Drop itself, a perfect round dry shaft, 25 feet deep. There is no exit." The bottom of the shaft was dug by Bob Leakey and Gordon Batty in the 1950s, but without breaking through. The challenge was then picked up by members of the Gritstone Club in 1965, who succeeded in digging down a little further to expose a tight crawl which proved to be the breakthrough point into the main cave. The end of the cave was connected to Death's Head Hole in 1981 by the Gritstone Club.

Short Long Drop was dug into and explored by members of the Red Rose Cave & Pothole Club in 2007.

References

Caves of Lancashire
Caves of the Three Counties System